The Maltese Government 2008–2013 was the Government of Malta from 11 March 2008 to 10 March 2013. The Prime Minister was Lawrence Gonzi.

Cabinet

|}

See also
List of Maltese governments
Maltese Government 2013–2018

Government of Malta
2008 establishments in Malta
2013 disestablishments in Malta
Cabinets established in 2008
Cabinets disestablished in 2013